12 (Vancouver) Field Ambulance is a Canadian Forces Primary Reserve medical unit in Vancouver, British Columbia.

History
This unit has a long and distinguished history that lives up to the medical corps tradition of being faithful in adversity. It is the latest in a line of Vancouver army medical units dating back to 18 Field Ambulance of World War I.

World War I
This unit started out initially as a local militia unit. In World War I, the field ambulance was sent to the 5th Canadian Division and stationed with the 72nd Battalion (Seaforth Highlanders of Canada), CEF, for a period of time. After the war, it was set up as a reserve unit and renamed 12 Field Ambulance. The unit was called to active service in World War II in 1939.

World War II
In 1942 the unit, now known as 12 Canadian Light Field Ambulance (the term "light" indicated that it was equipped to be particularly fast moving and so able to keep up with a swiftly advancing armoured division), sailed to England with the 4th (Canadian) Armoured Division. Providing medical support to the Division as they participated in operations within Europe. One of the unit's most significant action was in support of the 4th Armoured Division during the battle of Hochwald Forest. Captain Nathan Kaufman was Section Officer. His OBE award states that "On 2 March 1945, Captain Kaufman sited the most forward casualty collecting post in the Hochwald Gap and its position was responsible for the fact that early medical attention was given to the wounded in that sector.  Through all operations this officer has shown a consistent devotion to duty combined with an ability to get forward and complete his job despite the personal risk involved. His willingness to serve and his efficient handling of casualties has been an inspiration to all ranks of his unit."

12 Field Ambulance made Canadian medical corps history becoming the only field ambulance to engage the enemy in combat. This occurred one morning in April 1945 in the German town of Sogel. German soldiers approached, and fired upon the casualty treatment facility under cover of darkness. The commanding officer quickly organized two platoons, and placed them at the approaches to the dressing stations. They held off the enemy for two hours; with weapons borrowed from the woundedat the time medics did not carry weaponsuntil a squadron of tanks arrived to relieve them. During the fighting the dressing station continued treating patients. The commanding officer, Lieutenant-Colonel A.D. MacPherson received the Distinguished Service Order for his leadership in this action; Corporal F.F. Thompson was awarded the Military Medal, and Captain Harry Jolley was made a Member of the Order of the British Empire.

Post-World War II to 1999
After the war, 12 Field Ambulance was reverted to the Army Reserve (Militia) and moved to Jericho Garrison in 1947. The unit was then renamed 24 Medical Company following another move to Bessborough Armoury. In 1969, the medical unit became attached to 12 Vancouver Service Battalion. In the early 1970s, the unit was disbanded along with all militia medical units across Canada. After existing as a medical station at 12 Service Battalion for several years, the unit was raised as 12 (Vancouver) Medical Company in 1980 and is relocated back to its present location at Jericho Garrison later that year. During this period, the unit participated in numerous peace keeping missions and served on tours in Bosnia, Croatia, Cypress, Aviano and the Golan Heights.

2000 to present
12 Field Ambulance was involved with local operations ranging from G8 Security in 2002 to fighting BC Forest Fires in the year 2003. Recently, the unit was awarded Freedom of the City from the city of Vancouver in 2007. In addition to domestic operations, the unit participated in operations overseas, most recently in Operation Athena in Afghanistan.

Notable members

World War II
 Captain Palmer: After meeting with Willem Johan Kolff, directed the construction of a Kolff type mechanical kidney in Vancouver.
 Corporal FF. Thompson: Noted for being in the picture capturing a German soldier at the Battle of Sogel, where he was given the Military Medal for his actions during the sortie.

Post World War II–1999
 Lieutenant-Colonel Grasset: Proposed  (we hasten to aid the soldiers) as the motto of the CFMS in 1976. Taken into informal use shortly thereafter, it was formally approved on 10 August 1988.

Awards
Freedom of the City of Vancouver was given to the 12 (Vancouver) Field Ambulance on April 14, 2007.

Operations
12 Field Ambulance had members deployed in many domestic and foreign operations, including:

World War II
 Operation Blockbuster
 Operation Totalize
 Operation Tractable

Post World War II to 1999
 Operation Calumet
 Operation Dana Ca
 Operation Echo
 Operation Harmony
 Operation Palladium

2000 to Current
 Operation Athena
 Operation Grizzly
 Operation Peregrine
 Operation Paladium
 Operation Podium

References

External links
 12 (Vancouver) Field Ambulance Official Website
 12 (Vancouver) Field Ambulance Medical Museum Website 
 CFMS History/Heritage Page.
 Canadian Forces Medical Service : Introduction to its History and Heritage.
 Troop and Family Support Awareness Fundraiser
 Canadian War Museum.

Medical units and formations of Canada
12